The discography of J. Holiday, an American singer, consists of four studio albums, four mixtapes, five singles (including one as a featured performer) and five music videos.

Albums

Studio albums

Mixtapes

Singles

As lead artist

As featured performer

Other charted songs

Guest appearances

Music videos

Notes 

A  "It's Yours" did not enter the Billboard Hot 100, but peaked at number 3 on the Bubbling Under Hot 100 Singles chart, which acts as a 25-song extension to the Hot 100.
B  "Sign My Name" did not enter the Hot R&B/Hip-Hop Songs chart, but peaked at number 22 on the Bubbling Under R&B/Hip-Hop Singles chart, which acts as a 25-song extension to the Hot R&B/Hip-Hop Songs chart.

References 

Discographies of American artists
Hip hop discographies
Rhythm and blues discographies